Illegal Bass is the début album by Miami bass group Bass Outlaws.

Track listing

References 

 http://www.discogs.com/Bass-Outlaws-Illegal-Bass/release/2305548

1992 debut albums